Shravanabelgola (Rural)  is a village in the southern state of Karnataka, India. It is located in the Channarayapatna taluk of Hassan district in Karnataka.

Demographics
As of 2001 India census, Shravanabelgola (Rural) had a population of 6394 with 3309 males and 3085 females.

See also
 Hassan
 Districts of Karnataka

References

External links
 http://Hassan.nic.in/

Villages in Hassan district